HMS Stag was a two funnel, 30 knot destroyer ordered by the Royal Navy under the 1896 – 1897 Naval Estimates.  She was the sixth ship to carry this name. She was launched in 1899 and was first assigned to the Mediterranean. She served in the North Sea and Irish Sea during World War I, and was sold for breaking in 1921.

Design and construction
Stag was ordered by the British Admiralty from Thornycroft on 7 September 1897, one of five "thirty-knotter" torpedo-boat destroyers  ordered from various shipbuilders as part of the 1897–1898 construction programme. Stag was a slightly modified version of the three "thirty-knotters" ordered from Thornycroft the previous year, with a little more power, increased beam and a revised superstructure.

Displacement was  light and  full load, while crew was 63 officers and men. Stag was required to reach a speed of  during sea trials and carry an armament of a single QF 12 pounder 12 cwt ( calibre) gun, backed up by five 6-pounder guns, and two 18-inch (450 mm) torpedo tubes. An arched turtleback  forecastle was to be fitted.

Stag was laid down as yard number 334 on 16 April 1898 at Thornycroft's Chiswick shipyard on the River Thames and was launched on 18 November 1899. She was accepted in September 1900.

Pre-War
Lieutenant and Commander B. A. Austen was appointed in command of the Stag on 14 February 1902, and commissioned her at Chatham on 25 February for service with the Instructional Flotilla. Only weeks later, Lieutenant John Maxwell D. E. Warren was appointed in command from 18 March 1902. In May 1902 she transferred her officers and crew to HMS Sturgeon. She was commissioned at Chatham on 2 September 1902 by Commander Sir Douglas Egremont Robert Brownrigg for outbound journey to the Mediterranean, where she was placed in the fleet reserve at Malta. Her crew returned home, while Brownrigg succeeded in command of HMS Coquette, tender to HMS Orion, depot ship for destroyers on the Mediterranean Station.

On the night of 22 November 1910, Stag collided with the destroyer , with both destroyers suffering damaged stems. The cruisers  and  went to the assistance of the two damaged destroyers, which were taken into Syracuse, Sicily for repair. She remained with the Mediterranean Fleet until 1913. 

On 30 August 1912 the Admiralty directed all destroyers were to be grouped into classes designated by letters based on contract speed and appearance. The class letters were painted on the hull below the bridge area and on a funnel.

Stag left Malta in November 1911 and arrived at Plymouth on 1 December that year. On her return to the UK she joined the 6th Destroyer Flotilla, a patrol flotilla based at Devonport. These patrols, manned with nucleus crews only in peacetime, would have the wartime duty of defence of the East Coast, patrolling to prevent hostile ships from approaching the coast without being detected and attacked, and defence of ports against enemy raids. In January, Stag transferred to the 8th Destroyer Flotilla, another patrol flotilla based at Chatham.

World War I
In July 1914 she remained part of the 8th Destroyer Flotilla based at Chatham tendered to the destroyer depot ship . On 27 July, as the July Crisis brought war in Europe closer, the 8th Flotilla was ordered to Rosyth for defence of the Firth of Forth, and on 3 August, on the eve of the United Kingdom declaration of war upon Germany and entry to the First World War, was ordered to take up its war stations and therefore proceeded to sea. 

However, although there had been two attacks by German submarines against warships off the Forth that day, (by  against the torpedo boat  and by  against ) German records indicate that no submarine was in position to attack Stag, so Stags report was apparently mistaken. 

Stag was still part of the 8th Flotilla in July 1917, but in August, she had transferred to the 7th Destroyer Flotilla, which was employed on convoy escort duties on the east-coast of England. Stag remained part of the 7th Flotilla until January 1918, but in February was listed as having returned to the 8th Destroyer Flotilla on the Firth of Forth, and by March, had transferred to the Irish Sea Flotilla. She remained based in Ireland with the Irish Sea Hunting Flotilla based at Queenstown (now Cobh) in the South of Ireland until the end of the war.

Fate
In January 1919 she was laid up at the Nore. She was sold on 17 May 1921 to Thos. W. Ward for breaking at Grays, Essex on the Thames Estuary.

Pennant numbers

Notes

Citations

Bibliography

Further reading

Ships built in Chiswick
1899 ships
D-class destroyers (1913)
Ships built by John I. Thornycroft & Company